Serdar Meriç (born 10 October 1977) is a retired Turkish football striker.

References

1977 births
Living people
Turkish footballers
Altay S.K. footballers
Konyaspor footballers
Bucaspor footballers
Aydınspor footballers
Muğlaspor footballers
İzmirspor footballers
24 Erzincanspor footballers
Association football forwards
Süper Lig players